Alexandre Cabanel (28 September 1823 – 23 January 1889) was a French painter. He painted historical, classical and religious subjects in the academic style. He was also well known as a portrait painter. According to Diccionario Enciclopedico Salvat, Cabanel is the best representative of L'art pompier, and was Napoleon III's preferred painter.

Biography

Cabanel entered the École des Beaux-Arts in Paris at the age of seventeen,
and  studied with François-Édouard Picot. He exhibited at the Paris Salon for the first time in 1844, and won the Prix de Rome scholarship in 1845 at the age of 22. Cabanel was elected a member of the Institute in 1863. He was appointed professor at the École des Beaux-Arts in 1864 and taught there until his death.

He was closely connected to the Paris Salon:  "He was elected regularly to the Salon jury and his pupils could be counted by the hundred at the Salons. Through them, Cabanel did more than any other artist of his generation to form the character of belle époque French painting". His refusal together with William-Adolphe Bouguereau to allow the impressionist painter Édouard Manet and many other painters to exhibit their work in the Salon of 1863 led to the establishment of the Salon des Refusés by the French government. Cabanel won the Grande Médaille d'Honneur at the Salons of 1865, 1867, and 1878.

A successful academic painter, his 1863 painting The Birth of Venus is one of the best-known examples of 19th-century academic painting. The picture was bought by the emperor Napoleon III; there is also a smaller replica (painted in 1875 for a banker, John Wolf) at the Metropolitan Museum of Art in New York City. It was given to them by Wolf in 1893. The composition embodies ideals of Academic art: mythological subject, graceful modeling, silky brushwork, and perfected form. This style was perennially popular with collectors, even as it was challenged by artists seeking a more personal interpretation of truth to nature, such as Courbet.

Pupils

His pupils included:
 Rodolfo Amoedo
 Joseph Aubert
 Henry Bacon
 George Randolph Barse
 Alexandre Jean-Baptiste Brun
 Jean-Eugène Buland
 Jean-Joseph Benjamin-Constant
 Vlaho Bukovac
 Gaston Bussière
 Louis Capdevielle
 Eugène Carrière
 Eugène Chigot
 Jacqueline Comerre-Paton
 Fernand Cormon
 Pierre Auguste Cot
 Kenyon Cox
 Édouard Debat-Ponsan
 
 Louis Deschamps (painter)
 Émile Friant
 François Guiguet
 Jules Bastien-Lepage
 François Flameng
 Charles Fouqueray
 Frank Fowler
 Henri Gervex
 Charles Lucien Léandre
 Max Leenhardt
 Henri Le Sidaner
 Aristide Maillol
 
 João Marques de Oliveira
 Jan Monchablon
 Georges Moreau de Tours
 
 Henri Pinta
 Henri Regnault
 Iakovos Rizos
 Louis Royer
 Jean-Jacques Scherrer
 António Silva Porto
 Edward Stott
 Joseph-Noël Sylvestre
 Solomon Joseph Solomon
 Paul Tavernier
 José Ferraz de Almeida Júnior
 Étienne Terrus
 Adolphe Willette

Selected works

 The Fallen Angel (L'ange déchu, 1847), Musée Fabre, Montpellier
 Aglaé and Boniface (Aglaé et Boniface, 1857), The Cleveland Museum of Art, Cleveland, Ohio USA
 The Birth of Venus (La naissance de Vénus, 1863), Musée d'Orsay, Paris
 Napoleon III (1865), Musée national du château de Compiègne, Écouen, France
 The Death of Francesca da Rimini and Paolo Malatesta (La mort de Francesca de Rimini et de Paolo Malatesta, 1870), Musée d'Orsay, Paris
 Portrait de la comtesse de Keller (1873), Musée d'Orsay, Paris
 Thamar (1875)
 Phèdre (1880), Musée Fabre, Montpellier
 Ruth glanant dans les champs de Booz (1886), Musée Garinet, Châlons-en-Champagne
 Portrait de Mary Victoria Leiter (1887), Kedleston Hall, England,
 Cleopatra Testing Poisons on Condemned Prisoners (Cléopâtre essayant des poisons sur des condamnés à mort, 1887), Royal Museum of Fine Arts, Antwerp

Gallery

References

External links

 Alexandre Cabanel at Artcyclopedia
 Paintings of Alexandre Cabanel on Insecula
 Alexandre Cabanel at the Art Renewal Center
 Alexandre Cabanel at The Art in Pixels
 Alexandre Cabanel at alexandrecabanel.com
 https://www.metmuseum.org/art/collection/search/110000264

1823 births
1889 deaths
19th-century French painters
French male painters
Artists from Montpellier
French romantic painters
French neoclassical painters
Prix de Rome for painting
Academic art
Academic staff of the École des Beaux-Arts
Members of the Académie des beaux-arts
Members of the Royal Academy of Belgium
19th-century French male artists